Dicellitis is a genus of moths belonging to the subfamily Tortricinae of the family Tortricidae.

Species
Dicellitis cornucopiae Diakonoff, 1941
Dicellitis furcigera Meyrick, 1928
Dicellitis nigritula Meyrick, 1908

See also
List of Tortricidae genera

References

 , 1908, J. Bombay nat. Hist. Soc. 18: 616. 
 , 2005, World Catalogue of Insects 5.

External links
tortricidae.com

Archipini
Tortricidae genera